The 1900 Amur anti-Chinese pogroms were a series of killings and reprisals undertaken by the Russian Empire against subjects of the Qing dynasty of various ethnicities, including Manchu, Daur, and Han peoples. They took place in Blagoveshchensk and in the Sixty-Four Villages East of the River in the Amur region, during the same time as the Boxer Rebellion in China. The events ultimately resulted in thousands of deaths, the loss of residency for Chinese subjects living in the Sixty-Four Villages East of the River, and increased Russian control over the region. The Russian justification for the pogroms were attacks made on Russian infrastructure outside Blagoveshchensk by Chinese Boxers, which was then responded to by Russian force. The pogroms themselves occurred between 4–8 July (Old Style, O.S.; 17–21, New Style or N.S.), 1900.

Name
The name for the killings and reprisals that occurred in Amur is not standardized, and has been referred to by different names over time. The most common Chinese name for the pogroms is the Gengzi Russian Disaster, but the two most major events in Blagoveshchensk and the Sixty-Four Villages East of the River are referred to as the Blagoveshchensk Massacre and the Sixty-Four Villages East of the River Massacre respectively.

The Russian name of the pogroms in Blagoveshchensk is referred to as the Chinese Pogrom in Blagoveshchensk, while the killings and reprisals that took place in the Sixty-Four Villages East of the River are referred to as the Battle on the Amur (Russian: Бои на Амуре).

Background

Blagoveshchensk was founded on the territory ceded to Russia by Treaty of Aigun in 1858.

Process

Blagoveshchensk

Sixty-Four Villages East of the River
Lieutenant-General Konstantin Nikolaevich Gribskiy ordered the expulsion of all Qing subjects who remained north of the river. This included the residents of the villages, and Chinese traders and workers who lived in Blagoveshchensk proper, where they numbered anywhere between one-sixth and one-half of the local population of 30,000. They were taken by the local police and driven into the river to be drowned. Those who could swim were shot by the Russian forces. There were 1,266 households, including 900 Daurs and 4,500 Manchus in the area until the massacre. Many Manchu villages were burned by Cossacks in the massacre according to Victor Zatsepine.

Legacy
Andrew Higgins of The New York Times wrote that Chinese and Russian officials tended to not bring up the incidents during periods of good China-Russia relations or China-Soviet Union relations, while the incident was brought up after the Sino-Soviet split with people still alive who had been in the pogroms being interviewed by Chinese officials. Higgins stated that in 2020 Chinese and Russian officials purposefully avoided dealing with the incident.

References

Further reading
 

1900 riots
Mass murder in 1900
July 1900 events
Pogroms
Boxer Rebellion
War crimes in China
1900 in China
1900 in the Russian Empire
War crimes in Russia
China–Russia border
China–Russian Empire relations
1900 murders in China